Andy Joel Stanton (born 14 November 1973) is an English children's writer. He is best known for writing the Mr Gum series (illustrated by David Tazzyman), through which he made a popular contribution to children's literature. Stanton's writing is influenced by Roald Dahl and Enid Blyton.

Life 
Stanton grew up in the London suburbs of Harrow and Pinner and attended the Latymer School in Hammersmith. He studied English at Oxford University, but was "kicked out". He has worked as a film script reader, a cartoonist, and as a temporary medical secretary for the NHS.

Works

Mr Gum

Books 
The Mr Gum books are set in the fictitious town of Lamonic Bibber. The town has its own fictional newspaper, The Lamonical Chronicle, which features on the Mr Gum website as "Lamonic Bibber's second best and only paper". Characters in the books include Old King Thunderbelly and Polly.
The books have won numerous prizes including the 2007 Red House Children's Book Award, two Blue Peter Book Awards for Best Book With Pictures, and the inaugural Roald Dahl Funny Prize in 2008 for Mr Gum and the Dancing Bear. 

Stanton has written nine books in the Mr Gum series, published by Egmont Books in the UK and illustrated by Tazzyman:
 You're a Bad Man, Mr Gum! (2006)
 Mr Gum and the Biscuit Billionaire (2007)
 Mr Gum and the Goblins (2007)
 Mr Gum and the Power Crystals (2008)
 Mr Gum and the Dancing Bear (2008)
 What's for Dinner, Mr Gum? (2009)
 Mr Gum and the Cherry Tree (2010)
 Mr Gum and the Secret Hideout (2011)
 Mr Gum and the Hound of Lamonic Bibber (2011)

You're a Bad Man, Mr Gum! and Mr Gum and the Hound of Lamonic Bibber were later rereleased as special editions, featuring stickers.

Audiobooks 
The eight main books in the Mr Gum series were recorded as audiobooks produced and directed by David Tyler for BBC Audio, with the author himself reading. Additionally, the first four books in the series were recorded, with Kate Winslet narrating, in 2012.

Stage 
Stanton wrote the book and lyrics for Mr Gum and the Dancing Bear - The Musical! which premiered at the National Theatre in July 2019.

Other books 
Additionally, Stanton has written several other books published by various publishers:

 Danny McGee Drinks the Sea (2016)
 Natboff! One Million Years of Stupidity (2018)
 When I Was a Child (2019)
 The Paninis of Pompeii (2019)
 Going to the Volcano (2020)
 The Story of Matthew Buzzington (2021)
 Sterling and the Canary (2021)

Personal life 
Stanton is Jewish.

References

External links
 Mr Gum – series website by publisher Egmont UK.
 .

Living people
English children's writers
Writers from London
1973 births
Alumni of the University of Oxford
Jewish writers